Tttrial and Eror is a mini-LP by German electronic musician Apparat. It was released on 18 February 2002 on Shitkatapult label. Tttrial and Eror was recorded at Tracnet Studio, Berlin in 2001.

Track listing

Credits
Credits adapted from the liner notes of Tttrial and Eror.
 Saxophone: Hormel Eastwood (track 3)
 Mastered by Robert Henke

References

External links
 
 Tttrial and Eror on Shitkatapult

2002 EPs
Apparat (musician) albums
Intelligent dance music EPs